Alexander "Alex" Frank Nimo (born March 21, 1990) is a Liberian-born American soccer player.

Early life
Alex moved with his parents, Tommy and Maima Nimo, to a refugee camp in Ghana as an infant. There he spent most of the first nine years of his life as the family escaped from the First Liberian Civil War. Nimo and his family were granted asylum as political refugees and moved to Oregon with the assistance of Catholic Ministries. In Oregon, he was discovered by the late University of Portland soccer coach Clive Charles and placed in F.C. Portland.

Career

Youth
In 2003, Nimo was chosen for the player pool of the under-14 U.S. national team. The  midfielder attended Benson Polytechnic High School in Portland, and was a two-time all-state forward. He was considered one of the best players to ever come out of Oregon. He was named a Parade All-American, and all-state at Benson. Nimo received his U.S. citizenship in November 2006. In 2007, he joined the U.S. Residency camp located in Bradenton, Florida, and played for the U-17 national team.

Professional
In the 2008 MLS SuperDraft, Nimo—who had already been signed by the league to a Generation Adidas contract worth $45,000 per year—was selected 17th overall by Real Salt Lake.  He scored his first goal for the team on July 9, 2008, in an exhibition game against Santos Laguna, but would not see any league appearances during the season.  Shortly before the opening of the 2009 season, in March, the club announced that Nimo would be loaned out to the Portland Timbers of the USL First Division.  He was loaned to the Timbers again for the 2010 season.

It was announced on November 18, 2010, that Nimo would graduate from the MLS Generation Adidas program at the end of the 2010 season.

On January 10, 2012 Nimo went on trial with Polish team Bytovia Bytów, which played in Polish Second League (3rd tier).

JK Tammeka Tartu
On March 7, 2012 Nimo signed a two-year contract with Estonian Meistriliiga club JK Tammeka Tartu. He made 34 appearances and scored six goals for the team in that season. The contract was mutually terminated before the 2013 season.

International
In 2006, Nimo was called up to the United States U-17 men's national soccer team as it entered its qualification campaign for the 2007 FIFA U-17 World Cup.  He then played all four U.S. games at the World Cup as the U.S. went to the Round of 16 before being eliminated by Germany.  In 2008, he became a regular with the United States U-20.

Honors

Portland Timbers
USL First Division Commissioner's Cup (1): 2009

References

External links

Portland Timbers player profile
Alex Nimo in United States U-17 men's national soccer team - http://ussoccer.com
Nimo's long journey leads him to Utah  LiberianSoccer.com
2008 combine notable for defensive talent – ESPN
 

1990 births
Living people
Liberian footballers
American soccer players
Association football forwards
American people of Liberian descent
Real Salt Lake players
Portland Timbers (2001–2010) players
Sportspeople from Monrovia
USL First Division players
USSF Division 2 Professional League players
American expatriate soccer players
Tartu JK Tammeka players
Meistriliiga players
Expatriate footballers in Estonia
Benson Polytechnic High School alumni
Soccer players from Portland, Oregon
United States men's youth international soccer players
United States men's under-20 international soccer players
Real Salt Lake draft picks
American expatriate sportspeople in Estonia
Liberian expatriate sportspeople in Estonia